The Fünfseenland is the name for an area in Upper Bavaria between, and including, the Ammersee and Starnberger See, which contains the remainder of the great glacial lakes of the area (Pilsensee, Wörthsee and the Weßlinger See).

Gallery 

Lakes of Bavaria